Yasmani Georges Duk Arandia (born 1 March 1988) is a Bolivian professional football striker who plays for Club Aurora.

International career
Duk was convened for the first time to the Bolivia national team in front of Colombia on 22 March 2013. Duk started all three group stage matches for Bolivia at the Copa America Centenario.

Duk earned his first cap for the Bolivia national team and scored his first international goal on 17 November 2015 against Paraguay in the 2018 FIFA World Cup qualification. From 2013-15, he took the pitch for Oriente Petrolero of Bolivia’s top flight, netting 21 times in 61 appearances for the four-time league champions.

The 27-year-old No. 9 has competed professionally in his home country for six years, mostly with Oriente Petrolero. He scored seven goals in 38 appearances on loan to La Paz F.C. from 2012–13, and joined Sport Boys Warnes, his most recent club, in 2015. With Duk Sport Boys captured its first Torneo Apertura  title, qualifying for the 2017 Copa Libertadores.

Duk signed with Club San José for the 2019 season. In January 2020, he moved to Club Aurora.

International goals
Scores and results list Bolivia's goal tally first

References

External links
 
 
 

1988 births
Living people
Sportspeople from Santa Cruz de la Sierra
Association football forwards
Bolivian footballers
Bolivian expatriate footballers
Bolivia international footballers
Oriente Petrolero players
La Paz F.C. players
New York Cosmos (2010) players
Ettifaq FC players
Sport Boys Warnes players
Club San José players
Club Aurora players
Bolivian Primera División players
North American Soccer League players
Saudi Professional League players
Bolivian expatriate sportspeople in the United States
Expatriate footballers in Saudi Arabia
Expatriate soccer players in the United States